, also known as 8bit, is a Japanese animation studio established in September 2008 by former Satelight members.

On June 8, 2020, it was announced that Eight Bit had entered a partnership with Bandai Namco to create multiple anime productions. Their first project will be The Slime Diaries: That Time I Got Reincarnated as a Slime.

On November 1, 2021, Eight Bit opened a new studio in the Niigata Prefecture.

Works

Television series

Films

Original video animations

References

External links
 

 
Japanese companies established in 2008
Animation studios in Tokyo
Mass media companies established in 2008
Japanese animation studios
Suginami